Plestiodon takarai, the Senkaku skink, is a species of lizard which is found in Japan.

References

takarai
Reptiles described in 2017
Taxa named by Tsutomu Hikida